Jasna Rather born Jasna Fazlić, born December 20, 1970  in Foča, SFR Yugoslavia is former American table tennis player who played for Yugoslavia and then for United States, competing on four Olympics: in Seoul 1988 Summer Olympics, Barcelona 1992 Summer Olympics, Sydney 2000 Summer Olympics, and Athens 2004 Summer Olympics respectively.

Olympics participation
In 1988 she won the bronze medal for Yugoslavia in the women's doubles together with Gordana Perkučin. Four years later she competed as an Independent Olympic Participant. In 2000 and 2004 she participated for the United States.

Personal life
Jasna lived in Zagreb for the most of her childhood and youth. From 1992 to 1997 she was married to Ilija Lupulesku. After separating from Lupulesku in 1996, she played in Japan for a short while, then moved to the United States. After her divorce she legally changed her name to Reed.  Jasna got married on August 20, 2009 to William H. Rather IV, and changed her last name to Rather. Jasna and William have one daughter, Izabel Rather, who was born on December 18, 2011.

Coaching
As of 2006, she is the Head Table Tennis Coach at Texas Wesleyan University. Since the inception of the table tennis program at Texas Wesleyan University, the team has brought back to Texas 69 collegiate national titles in team, singles and doubles events.

Table Tennis Career
1988, 1992, 2000, 2004 Olympian                                                                                               *1988 Bronze Olympic Medal Seoul Korea                                                                                         *1988 and 1992 European Champion                                                                                               *2003 and 2005 US women's singles champion                                                                                                               
Jasna was inducted into the USA Table Tennis Hall of Fame December 2011

References

External links

playing record
profile
Fort Worth Weekly article on Reed and Texas Wesleyan table tennis

1970 births
Living people
People from Foča
Bosnia and Herzegovina sportswomen
Yugoslav table tennis players
American female table tennis players
Table tennis players at the 1988 Summer Olympics
Table tennis players at the 1992 Summer Olympics
Table tennis players at the 2000 Summer Olympics
Table tennis players at the 2004 Summer Olympics
Olympic table tennis players of Yugoslavia
Olympic table tennis players as Independent Olympic Participants
Olympic table tennis players of the United States
Olympic bronze medalists for Yugoslavia
Olympic medalists in table tennis
Medalists at the 1988 Summer Olympics
Pan American Games medalists in table tennis
Pan American Games gold medalists for the United States
Table tennis players at the 2003 Pan American Games
Bosnia and Herzegovina emigrants to the United States
Medalists at the 2003 Pan American Games
21st-century American women